Wilhelm Gustaf (Wille) Särkkä (26 February 1877 in Suomenniemi – 18 April 1968) was a Finnish farmer and politician. He was a member of the Parliament of Finland from 1917 to 1929 and again from 1930 to 1936, representing the Young Finnish Party from 1917 to 1918 and the National Progressive Party from 1918 on. He died in Lappeenranta on the 18th of April, 1968.

References

1877 births
1968 deaths
People from Suomenniemi
People from Viipuri Province (Grand Duchy of Finland)
Young Finnish Party politicians
National Progressive Party (Finland) politicians
Members of the Parliament of Finland (1917–19)
Members of the Parliament of Finland (1919–22)
Members of the Parliament of Finland (1922–24)
Members of the Parliament of Finland (1924–27)
Members of the Parliament of Finland (1927–29)
People of the Finnish Civil War (White side)